Sir Eric Denholm Pridie, KCMG, DSO, OBE (10 January 1896 – 3 September 1978) was a British medical doctor and civil servant. He was Director of the Sudan Medical Service from 1933 to 1945 and Chief Medical Officer, Colonial Office from 1949 to 1958.

References 

 https://history.rcplondon.ac.uk/inspiring-physicians/sir-eric-denholm-pridie

External links 

 

1896 births
1978 deaths
British medical administrators
20th-century British medical doctors
Knights Commander of the Order of St Michael and St George
Companions of the Distinguished Service Order
Officers of the Order of the British Empire
Anglo-Egyptian Sudan people
Civil servants in the Colonial Office
Alumni of the University of Liverpool
King's Own Royal Regiment officers
British Army personnel of World War I
Fellows of the Royal College of Physicians
Royal Army Medical Corps officers
British Army personnel of World War II